Baby, Baby, Baby, or variants, may refer to:

 Baby, Baby, Baby (Mindy Carson album), 1959
 Baby, Baby, Baby (Jimmy Witherspoon album), 1963
 "Baby, Baby, Baby" (Teresa Brewer song), 1953
 "Baby Baby Baby" (Joss Stone song), 2007
 "Baby, Baby, Baby," song by Sam Cooke, 1963
 "Baby-Baby-Baby", song by TLC, 1992
 "Baby Baby Baby", song by Aretha Franklin on the 1967 album I Never Loved a Man the Way I Love You
 "Baby Baby Baby", song by Endeverafter on the 2007 album Kiss or Kill

See also
 "Baby, Baby, Baby, Baby, Baby...", a song from R. Kelly's 1995 eponymous album
Baby (disambiguation)
Baby, Baby (disambiguation)